Mp3tag is a metadata tag editor that supports many popular audio file formats. It is freeware for Microsoft Windows, while it costs USD $19.99 for Apple macOS in the Mac App Store.

Features
 Batch Tag Editing. Write ID3v1.1, ID3v2.3, ID3v2.4, MPEG-4, WMA, APEv2 tags, and Vorbis comments to multiple files at once.
 Full Unicode support
 Support for embedded album cover art
 Automatically creates playlists
 Recursive subfolder support
 User-defined field mappings
 Remove parts of a tag or the entire tag from multiple files
 Rename files based on the tag information
 Import tags from filenames and text files 
 Format tags and filenames
 Replace characters or words from tags and filenames
 Regular expressions
 Export tag information to user-defined formats (i.e. HTML, RTF, CSV, XML and TXT)
 Import tag information from online databases like freedb, discogs, MusicBrainz or Amazon (also by text-search)
 Import tag information from local freedb databases
 Support for ID3v2.3 (ISO-8859-1 and UTF-16) and ID3v2.4 with UTF-8

It includes support for the following audio formats:
 Advanced Audio Coding (.aac)
 Apple Lossless Audio Codec (.alac)
 Audio Interchange File Format (.aif/.aifc/.aiff)
 Direct Stream Digital Audio (.dsf)
 Free Lossless Audio Codec (.flac)
 Matroska (.mka/.mkv)
 Monkey's Audio (.ape)
 MPEG Layer 3 (.mp3)
 MPEG-4 (.mp4/.m4a/.m4b/.m4v)
 Musepack (.mpc)
 Ogg Vorbis (.ogg)
 IETF Opus (.opus)
 OptimFROG (.ofr/.ofs)
 Speex (.spx)
 Tom's Audio Kompressor (.tak)
 True Audio (.tta)
 Windows Media Audio (.wma)
 WavPack (.wv)
 WAV (.wav)

Example
The following is an example of an M3U playlist file for "Jar of Flies" album by "Alice in Chains" that was created by Mp3tag with the following custom option settings: 
 playlist extended info format = "%artist% - %title%"
 playlist filename format = "%artist%_%album%_00_Playlist.m3u"
 tag to filename conversion format = "%artist%_%album%_$num(%track%,2)_%title%"

#EXTM3U
#EXTINF:419,Alice in Chains - Rotten Apple
Alice in Chains_Jar of Flies_01_Rotten Apple.mp3
#EXTINF:260,Alice in Chains - Nutshell
Alice in Chains_Jar of Flies_02_Nutshell.mp3
#EXTINF:255,Alice in Chains - I Stay Away
Alice in Chains_Jar of Flies_03_I Stay Away.mp3
#EXTINF:256,Alice in Chains - No Excuses
Alice in Chains_Jar of Flies_04_No Excuses.mp3
#EXTINF:157,Alice in Chains - Whale And Wasp
Alice in Chains_Jar of Flies_05_Whale And Wasp.mp3
#EXTINF:263,Alice in Chains - Don't Follow
Alice in Chains_Jar of Flies_06_Don't Follow.mp3
#EXTINF:245,Alice in Chains - Swing On This
Alice in Chains_Jar of Flies_07_Swing On This.mp3

See also
 List of tag editors
 ID3
 M3U

References

External links
 
 MP3tag developers
 
 Joe Betz. MP3: Musik finden, laden, hören, brennen. Pearson Deutschland GmbH; 2004 [cited September 24, 2011]. . p. 162. 

Windows-only freeware
Tag editors
C++ software
Year of introduction missing